Klapper is a surname. Notable people with the surname include:

 Bonnie S. Klapper (born 1957), an American lawyer
 David Klapper, co-founder of Finish Line, Inc.
 Gilbert Klapper, a paleontologist
 Ilse von Klapper, wife of William S. Burroughs from 1937 to 1946
 Leora Klapper, an economist
 Paul Klapper (1885–1952), a Romanian-American educator
 Radu Klapper (1937–2006), an Israeli-Romanian poet and author

See also
 Klapper Hall, an early building at City College of New York

See also
 Klapp